Zepita (from Aymara Sipita) is one of seven districts of the Chucuito Province in Puno Region, Peru.

Geography 
Other mountains are listed below:

Ethnic groups 
The people in the district are mainly indigenous citizens of Aymara descent. Aymara is the language which the majority of the population (87.08%) learnt to speak in childhood, 12.21% of the residents started speaking using the Spanish language (2007 Peru Census).

Authorities

Mayors 
 2011-2014: Ricardo Felipe Jiménez Castilla.
 2007-2010: Mateo Jilaja Mollo.

See also 
 Tanqa Tanqa
 Administrative divisions of Peru

References

External links 
 INEI Peru